Jean-Marie Musy (10 April 1876 – 19 April 1952) was a Swiss politician.

Affiliated with the Christian Democratic People's Party of Switzerland, he was elected to the Federal Council of Switzerland on 11 December 1919 served until 30 April 1934.

During his time in office he held the Department of Finance and became President of the Confederation twice, in 1925 and 1930.

Musy was acquainted with Heinrich Himmler. Toward the end of World War II, the forces of Nazi Germany were retreating and near defeat. At the request of two Swiss Orthodox Jews, Recha Sternbuch and her husband Yitzchak Sternbuch, and in coordination with them, Musy and his son Benoît Musy engaged in high-level negotiations with the Nazis to rescue large numbers of Jews in the  concentration camps. The group was saved after $1.25 million was placed in Swiss banks by Jewish organizations working in Switzerland. However, the money was never paid to the Nazis.

Jean-Marie Musy's son  Pierre received numerous equestrian competition titles and won the  four-man bobsleigh gold medal at the 1936 Winter Olympics in Garmisch-Partenkirchen, Germany.

References

External links
Jean-Marie Musy biography in English Jean-Marie Musy – President of Switzerland
Jean-Marie Musy biographie en français Jean-Marie Musy Conseiller Fédéral Suisse

 

1876 births
1952 deaths
People from Gruyère District
Swiss Roman Catholics
Christian Democratic People's Party of Switzerland politicians
Members of the Federal Council (Switzerland)
Finance ministers of Switzerland
Members of the National Council (Switzerland)
University of Fribourg alumni